Lynn Chang (born 1953) is a Chinese American violinist known for his work as both a soloist and a chamber musician. Chang is a founding member of the Boston Chamber Music Society and is currently a faculty member at MIT, Boston University, the Boston Conservatory, and the New England Conservatory of Music.

Education
A native of Boston, Chang began his violin study at the age of seven with Sarah Scriven and Alfred Krips of the Boston Symphony Orchestra. He continued his studies at the Juilliard School under the tutelage of Ivan Galamian, then went on to receive his bachelor's degree from Harvard University.

Career
Chang has appeared as a soloist with many of the world's finest orchestras including the Miami Symphony Orchestra, Utah Symphony Orchestra, Oakland East Bay Symphony, Seattle Symphony Orchestra, Honolulu Symphony Orchestra, Beijing Symphony Orchestra, Taipei Symphony Orchestra, and Hong Kong Philharmonic among others. He has also performed with several notable musicians such as Yo-Yo Ma and Dawn Upshaw. Chang has also given many recitals throughout the United States and has performed in such halls as Davis Hall in San Francisco, Weill Hall in New York City, and the Kennedy Center in Washington, DC. Chang also makes frequent appearances at music festivals throughout the United States including the Killington Music Festival, Musicorda Festival, Wolf Trap, Great Woods Festival, Marlboro Festival, and the Tanglewood Music Festival.

Chang has also collaborated with members of the Juilliard String Quartet, Guarneri String Quartet, Tokyo String Quartet, Cleveland String Quartet, Vermeer String Quartet, Muir String Quartet and Orion String Quartet.

Lynn Chang has led a busy and successful teaching career for over three decades. His former students now perform in such orchestras as the Chicago Symphony, Los Angeles Philharmonic and the Metropolitan Opera Orchestra in New York.  His former student, Joseph Lin was recently named first violin of the Juilliard String Quartet. Chang also leads Hemenway Strings at The Boston Conservatory, a conductorless string chamber ensemble.

In 2008, Lynn Chang was elected to the Board of Overseers at Harvard University.

Awards and honors

 Chang is a second prize winner at the International Paganini Competition.
 Chang is a winner of the Concert Artists Guild and the Young Concert Artists International Auditions.
 Chang was the first recipient of the Distinguished Leadership Award given by the Institute for Asian American Studies at the University of Massachusetts Boston.
 In 1995, Chang and Yo-Yo Ma performed the world premiere of Ivan Tcherepnin’s Double Concerto which received the Grawmeyer Award for best new composition.
 On December 10, 2010, Lynn Chang was the solo violinist at the Nobel Peace Prize ceremony in Oslo, Norway in honor of 2010 Peace Prize laureate, Liu Xiaobo.
On December 4, 2011, Lynn Chang joined musicians Pamela Frank, Sharon Robinson, Jaime Laredo and Emmanuel Ax to salute honoree Yo-Yo Ma at the Kennedy Center Honors
In 2020 he was elected fellow of the American Academy of Arts and Sciences

Recordings
In addition to being heard on CDs released by the Boston Chamber Music Society, Chang can be heard on Yo-Yo Ma's Made in America CD on Sony, and Dawn Upshaw's Girl with Orange Lips Grammy Award winning CD on Nonesuch.

References 

American classical violinists
American musicians of Taiwanese descent
Harvard University alumni
MIT School of Humanities, Arts, and Social Sciences faculty
Living people
Paganini Competition prize-winners
American classical musicians of Chinese descent
1953 births
21st-century classical violinists
Fellows of the American Academy of Arts and Sciences